Isaac Hayes (1942–2008) was an American singer, actor, and producer.

Isaac Hayes may also refer to:
Isaac Hayes III (born 1975), American record producer and son of the singer
Isaac Israel Hayes (1832–1881), an arctic explorer

See also
Isaac Hays